Phyllis "Pippa" Latour MBE (born 8 April 1921) is a South African-born former agent of the United Kingdom's clandestine Special Operations Executive (SOE) organisation during World War II in France.

Early life
Latour's father, Philippe, was a French doctor and married to Louise, a British citizen living in South Africa, where Phyllis was born in April 1921. Her father died three months later in French Equatorial Africa (AEF) and her mother remarried three years later. Her stepfather was a racing driver, and would let his new wife race his automobiles as well. During one such race, her mother's car malfunctioned and she was killed when the car crashed into a barrier. Latour then went to live with her father's cousin in the AEF. She later returned to South Africa.

WAAF and Special Operations Executive
She moved from South Africa to England and joined the Women's Auxiliary Air Force (WAAF) in November 1941 (Service Number 718483) as a flight mechanic for airframes. Because of her fluent French, however, she was immediately asked by SOE to become an agent, and went through vigorous mental and physical training. The purpose of SOE was to conduct espionage, sabotage, and reconnaissance in countries occupied by the Axis powers, especially Nazi Germany. SOE agents allied themselves with resistance groups and supplied them with weapons and equipment parachuted in from England. She joined the SOE in revenge for her godmother's father having been shot by the Nazis and for her godmother's suicide after being imprisoned, officially joining on 1 November 1943 and was commissioned as an Honorary Section Officer.

She parachuted into Orne, Normandy on 1 May 1944 to operate as part of the Scientist circuit, using the codename Genevieve to work as a wireless operator with the organiser Claude de Baissac and his sister Lise, his courier and assistant.

Small of stature, Latour, who was fluent in French, posed as a teenage girl whose family had moved to the region to escape the Allied bombing. She rode bicycles around the area, selling soap and chatting with German soldiers. When she obtained any military intelligence, she encoded it for transmitting by knitting using one-time codes hidden on a piece of silk that she used to tie up her hair; she would translate them using Morse code equipment. At one point, she was brought in for questioning, but the German authorities did not think to examine her hair tie, and she was released. Latour's 135 coded messages helped guide bombing missions to enemy targets.

Post World War II
After World War II, Latour married an engineer with the surname Doyle, and went to live in Kenya, Fiji, and Australia. She now lives in Auckland, New Zealand. One hundred years old in April 2021, she is the last living female SOE agent of the forty who worked in France during World War II.

She did not discuss her wartime activities with her family until her children discovered them by reading about them on the Internet in 2000.

Honours and awards
In September 1945, Latour was appointed an additional Member of the Order of the British Empire, for services in France during the German occupation. She was appointed a Chevalier of the Legion of Honour (Knight of the Legion of Honour), by the French government on 29 November 2014, as part of the 70th anniversary of the battle of Normandy.

Notes

References
 Squadron Leader Beryl E. Escott, Mission Improbable: A salute to the RAF women of SOE in wartime France, London, Patrick Stevens Limited, 1991.  
 Liane Jones, A Quiet Courage: Women Agents in the French Resistance, London, Transworld Publishers Ltd, 1990.

External links
 A South African Girl in the Special Operations Executive (article by Ross Dix-Peek)

1921 births
Living people
South African centenarians
British centenarians
French centenarians
New Zealand centenarians
British Special Operations Executive personnel
Chevaliers of the Légion d'honneur
French Special Operations Executive personnel
Members of the Order of the British Empire
People from Durban
Recipients of the Croix de Guerre 1939–1945 (France)
Special Operations Executive personnel
Women's Auxiliary Air Force officers
Women centenarians
South African emigrants to the United Kingdom
British expatriates in France
British expatriates in Kenya
British expatriates in Fiji
British expatriates in Australia
British emigrants to New Zealand